Morlaye Sylla (born 23 July 1998) is a Guinean footballer who plays as a midfielder for Arouca and the Guinea national team.

International career
Sylla made his debut with the Guinea national team in a 1–0 2020 African Nations Championship qualification loss to Liberia on 21 September 2019.

References

External links
 
 
 Horoya profile

1998 births
Living people
Susu people
Guinean footballers
Guinea international footballers
Guinea under-20 international footballers
Guinea youth international footballers
Association football midfielders
Fello Star players
Horoya AC players
Guinée Championnat National players
2020 African Nations Championship players
Sportspeople from Conakry
2021 Africa Cup of Nations players
Guinea A' international footballers